Harley de Witt "Doc" Strong (November 10, 1916 – July 4, 1952) was an American wrestler. He competed in the men's freestyle lightweight at the 1936 Summer Olympics. In 1952, he was arrested for being drunk in public, and hanged himself in his cell.

References

External links
 

1916 births
1952 suicides
American male sport wrestlers
Olympic wrestlers of the United States
Wrestlers at the 1936 Summer Olympics
People from Lincoln County, Oklahoma
Suicides by hanging in Oklahoma
American people who died in prison custody
Prisoners who died in Oklahoma detention
People who committed suicide in prison custody